Beautiful but Broke (1944) is an American musical-comedy film starring Joan Davis and Jane Frazee.

Cast
 Joan Davis as Dottie Duncan
 Jane Frazee as Sally Richards
 Judy Clark as Sue Ford
 John Hubbard as Bill Drake
 Bob Haymes as Jack Foster

See also
List of American films of 1944

External links 
 
 

1944 films
1944 musical comedy films
American musical comedy films
American black-and-white films
Columbia Pictures films
1940s English-language films
Films directed by Charles Barton
1940s American films